Shelia is a Georgian surname. Notable people with the surname include:
Giorgi Shelia (born 1988), Russian footballer of Georgian origin
Murtaz Shelia (born 1969), Georgian former footballer
Viktoria Shelia (born 2000), Georgian rhythmic gymnast

Surnames of Georgian origin
Georgian-language surnames
Surnames of Abkhazian origin